Leiopyrga cingulata is a small species of sea snail, a marine gastropod mollusk in the family Trochidae, the top snails.

Description
The narrowly perforate, thin shell has a pyramidal-turbinate shape. It is shining, purplish, the base whitish, with a series of rufous spots. The four whorls are marked with distant elevated cinguli (3 on the body whorl). The base of the shell is concentrically deeply lirate. The umbilical region is surrounded by an elevated ridge.

The whorls are encircled with three transverse ridges, and there is a conspicuous ridge around the region of the umbilicus.

Distribution
This marine species is endemic to Australia and occurs off New South Wales and Queensland

References

 Adams, A. 1864. Description of a new genus and twelve new species of Mollusca. Proceedings of the Royal Society of London 1863: 506-509 
 Hedley, C. 1913. Studies of Australian Mollusca. Part XI. Proceedings of the Linnean Society of New South Wales 38: 258-339
 Wilson, B. 1993. Australian Marine Shells. Prosobranch Gastropods. Kallaroo, Western Australia : Odyssey Publishing Vol. 1 408 pp.

External links
 

cingulata
Gastropods of Australia
Gastropods described in 1864